Craig Kelly (April 1, 1966 – January 20, 2003) was an American professional snowboarder. 
Kelly is known as the 'Godfather of Freeriding'; Terje Håkonsen called Kelly the best snowboarder of all time. Over his 15-year professional career, he won 4 world championships and 3 U.S. championships; he won the Mt. Baker Banked Slalom snowboarding competition in 1988, 1991, and 1993.

Education
He attended the University of Washington where he was a member of the Delta Upsilon fraternity and studied Chemical Engineering.

Life and snowboarding career
Craig grew up in Mount Vernon, WA, a mid-sized town centrally located for equidistant travel to ski areas such as Mount Baker, Stevens Pass and Snoqualmie. Craig spent a lot of time at the Pac West ski area (Hyak, WA) in 1985–86. He used to come up on Mondays when the ski area was closed and would set up gates with some of the workers and run them using a snowmobile to get back and forth. He also won the first snowboard contest held at Hyak, in the 1985–86 season. It was done in conjunction with another founder of the sport, Bob Barci.

Craig was a Sims Snowboards rider, founded by Tom Sims, from 1983 until 1987. He spent the remainder of his life riding for Burton Snowboards owned by Jake Burton Carpenter.

Craig Kelly starred in a "Wrigleys Gum" commercial in 1988/1989 where he was featured doing a 540. Craig appeared in Warren Miller movies for several consecutive years.  In 2003 Warren Miller dedicated a segment in his film titled "Journey" to Craig. Craig had starring, uncredited, roles in Siberia and P-Tex, Lies & Duct Tape, which were both Greg Stump films. Craig Kelly was the first snowboarder to appear in an IMAX movie.

He shocked the snowboard industry by walking away from multimillion-dollar deals, at the height of the snowboard craze, to pursue his passion for freeriding. It was in freeriding where Craig felt the happiest. At the time, an unheard of strategy for a pro snowboarder.

He was part owner and on the board of directors of Island Lake Catskiing near Fernie B.C. where he spent a lot of time freeriding and filming.

The distinctive fluid manner in which he rode was recognized and acclaimed in the snowboarding community. He was called a "style master" by TransWorld Snowboard Magazine editor Jon Foster. Kelly also appeared in an enormous number of video and photo shoots. He was known for looking straight at the camera, even in the midst of a difficult aerial manoeuvre.

The Craig Kelly World Snowboard Camp was created to help kids improve their snowboarding skills. From 1988 to 1992 it was located in Whistler Blackcomb. Craig was responsible for the design and development of the following Burton signature models: The Mystery Air, The Craig Kelly Air, The CK Slopestyle, The Cascade, and The Omen. Jake Burton is quoted as saying, “When I started listening to Craig that was when my company became successful and really took off.” He added, “… when the rest of the industry listened to Craig, that was when the sport really took off.”

In the last few years of his life, Craig embarked on a 14-month journey starting up in Alaska and going down to Chile with his partner (girlfriend) Savina and two friends for adventure, surfing and living. He returned from his journey with his new baby Olivia, as a "souvenir" he said, from his trip.

Craig Kelly was studying to become a Certified Canadian Mountain Guide.

Craig died on 20 January 2003 near Revelstoke, British Columbia, Canada in an avalanche which trapped 8 people and killed 6 others.

Craig Kelly memorial
In 2012 the owner of Baldface lodge, Jeff Pensiero, asked Keith Berens of Live Metal Studio to design the memorial sculpture.

The memorial is a 10-ft welded steel sword (often mistaken for a cross), with coloured glass set within and a prayer wheel made from local yew wood beneath. It was unveiled on 20 January 2013.

The cross overlooks Baldface Lodge near Nelson, British Columbia. It was sponsored by Baldface Lodge and Burton Snowboards.

See also
Mount Baker Hard Core

References

External links
Craig Kelly interview in frequency: The Snowboarder's Journal
 Craig Kelly interview in frequency: The Snowboarder's Journal
 Craig Kelly is My Copilot
 Let It Ride (the movie)
 http://www.nationalgeographic.com/adventure/0304/story.html#story_2
 http://www.livemetalstudio.com/?project=craig-kelly-memorial

American male snowboarders
1966 births
2003 deaths
20th-century American people
21st-century American people